Graduate School of Engineering and Faculty of Engineering (京都大学大学院工学研究科・工学部) is one of schools at the Kyoto University. The Faculty (Undergraduate) and the Graduate School operate as one. 

According to the QS World University Rankings by Subject 2020 in the field of Engineering & Technology, KU is ranked third in Japan after University of Tokyo and TokyoTech.

History 
In 1897, College of Science and Engineering (理工科大学) was established with the establishment of Imperial University of Kyoto. It was divided into College of Engineering (工科大学) and College of Science in 1914.

College of Engineering was reorganized into Faculty of Engineering (工学部) in 1919.

In 1953, Graduate School of Engineering (工学研究科) was established.

In the 1990s, A four-year plan to emphasize graduate school education was implemented and some departments were converted into independent graduate schools; Graduate School of Energy Science was established in 1996 and Graduate School of Informatics in 1998.

Divisions 

It consists of the undergraduate schools, departments and centers.

Undergraduate Schools 
The Faculty of Engineering has 6 Undergraduate Schools, some of which have more specialized courses.

 Civil, Environmental and Resources Engineering
 Civil Engineering course
 Environmental Engineering course - connected to the Graduate School of Global Environmental Studies
 Earth Resources and Energy Engineering course - connected to the Graduate School of Energy Science
 Architecture
 Engineering Science
 Mechanical and Systems Engineering course
 Aeronautics and Astronautics course
 Materials Science course
 Nuclear Engineering course
 Applied Energy Science and Engineering course
 Electrical and Electronic Engineering
 Informatics and Mathematical Science - connected to the Graduate School of Informatics
 Applied Mathematics and Physics course
 Computer Science course
 Chemical Science and Technology
 Frontier Chemistry course
 Advanced Chemistry course
 Chemical Process Engineering course

Departments 
Graduate School of Engineering has 17 departments for research and graduate education.

 Civil and Earth Resources Engineering
 Urban Management
 Environmental Engineering
 Architecture and Architectural Engineering
 Mechanical Engineering and Science
 Micro Engineering
 Aeronautics and Astronautics
 Nuclear Engineering
 Materials Science and Engineering
 Electrical Engineering
 Electronic Science and Engineering
 Material Chemistry
 Energy and Hydrocarbon Chemistry
 Molecular Engineering
 Polymer Chemistry
 Synthetic Chemistry and Biological Chemistry
 Chemical Engineering

Centers and Facilities 

 Photonics and Electronics Science and Engineering Center
 Research Center for Environmental Quality Management
 Quantum Science and Engineering Center
 Katsura Int'tech Center
 Center for Information Technology
 Occupational Health, Safety and Environmental Management Center
 Engineering Education Research Center
 Research Administration Center
 The Unit for Enhancement of Engineering Higher Education in Myanmar
 Technical Office
 Radioisotope Research Laboratory
 Libraries

References

External links 

 

Engineering
Kyoto